François Angelier (born 22 August 1958) is a French journalist, presenter, essayist, biographer and author of fantasy novels.

Biography
Angelier's early discovery of Owen, Claude Seignolle, Michel de Ghelderode, Kubin, Meyrink and especially Jean Ray fired his interest in mauvais genres.  After studying in Paris and a short time with a theatre troupe, Angelier made his radio debut in 1981 with a programme on H.P. Lovecraft.  With Emmanuel Laurentin and Jean-Christophe Ogier, he launched Bande à Parte on the French radio station France Culture in summer 1991—a programme dedicated to fantasy, fiction and comic books.

Awards
 Prix du Roman, Fantastic'Arts, Gérardmer 2001 for Le Templier.

Bibliography

Novel
 Le Templier (Masque GF, 2001)

Anthologies
 La Nuit (Éd. J. Million, 1995)
 La Salette : apocalypse, pèlerinage et littérature (1856-1996) (Éd. J. Million, 2000, with Claude Langlois).

Essays, Biographies
 Le Drageoir aux épines ou l'intime souffrance de Joris-Karl Huysmans (1993) ;
 Saint François de Sales ou Monsieur des abeilles (Pygmalion "Chemins d’éternité", 1997) ;
 Paul Claudel : chemins d'éternité (Pygmalion "Chemins d’éternité", 2001) ;
 Claudel ou la conversion sauvage (Salvator "Juste un débat", 2003) ;
 Dictionnaire Jules Verne (Pygmalion, 2006).

References

External links

  Site de l'émission Mauvais Genres sur France Culture
  F. Angelier sur le site etonnants-voyageurs

French fantasy writers
Living people
1958 births
Place of birth missing (living people)
French male writers
Radio France people